Huan Shu of Quwo (802–731 BC), ancestral name Ji (姬), given name Chengshi (成師), was the first ruler of the state of Quwo during the Spring and Autumn period. He was the son of Marquis Mu of Jin and uncle of  Marquis Zhao of Jin.

In 745 BC, the first year of the reign of Marquis Zhao of Jin, Marquis Zhao enfeoffed Chengshi at Quwo (around modern Quwo County, Shanxi). He was then known as Huan Shu of Quwo. He was then 58 years old. He was said to be a benevolent ruler beloved by the people of Quwo.

In 739 BC, the seventh year of his reign, a Jin official named Panfu (潘父) murdered Marquis Zhao and invited Huan Shu to ascend the throne of Jin. He accepted Panfu's welcome and attempted to enter Jin, but he was defeated by the Jin troops and retreated to Quwo. Then, the Jin people asked the son of Marquis Zhao of Jin, Ping, to ascend the throne and he became the next marquis: Marquis Xiao of Jin.

In 731 BC, Huan Shu died and his son, Shan, ascended the throne as the next ruler of Quwo: Count Zhuang of Quwo. Another son of Huan Shu, Han Wan, became the progenitor of the State of Han.

Monarchs of Jin (Chinese state)
8th-century BC Chinese monarchs
802 BC births
731 BC deaths